HMS Kent, pennant number 54, was a  heavy cruiser built for the Royal Navy in the late 1920s. She was the lead ship of the Kent subclass. After completion the ship was sent to the China Station where she remained until the beginning of the Second World War, aside from a major refit in 1937–38. Kent hunted the German pocket battleship  in the East Indies in late 1939 and then was reassigned to troop convoy escort duties in the Indian Ocean in early 1940. She was transferred to the Mediterranean in mid-1940, but was torpedoed shortly after arriving. The ship was under repair for a year and was then assigned to Home Fleet where she escorted convoys to and from North Russia for the next several years. In mid-1944 Kent escorted British aircraft carriers as their aircraft made attacks on German shipping and airfields in Norway. A few months later she was flagship of a force that intercepted a German convoy in Norwegian waters and sank two freighters and five escorts. The ship was paid off in early 1945 and placed in reserve until she was used as a target. Kent was sold for scrap in 1948.

Description
Steam for the turbines was provided by eight Admiralty 3-drum water-tube boilers. The ship's complement was 784 officers and men.

The ship mounted eight 50-calibre 8-inch (203 mm) guns in four twin gun turrets. Her secondary armament consisted of four QF  Mk V anti-aircraft (AA) guns in single mounts. Kent mounted four single 2-pounder (40 mm) light AA guns ("pom-poms"). The ship carried two quadruple torpedo tube above-water mounts for  torpedoes.

Kent was only lightly protected with little more than a single inch of plating protecting vital machinery. Space and weight was reserved for one aircraft catapult and its seaplane, but they were not fitted until after she was completed.

History
Kent was built by Chatham Dockyard and laid down on 15 November 1924. She was launched on 16 March 1926 and commissioned 25 June 1928. The ship was assigned to the 5th Cruiser Squadron on the China Station and spent the bulk of the interbellum period there. In 1929–30 she received a High-Angle Control System, used to direct her anti-aircraft guns, and an aircraft catapult was also fitted. Her AA armament was reinforced by the addition of two single 4-inch guns abreast the forward funnel in 1932–33.

In January 1934, while serving as the flagship of Admiral Sir Frederick Dreyer, she attended the Far Eastern Naval Conference in Singapore together with Terror, Veteran, Wren and Eagle. At the conclusion of the conference, Dreyer transferred his flag to the Suffolk and Kent was dispatched to the United Kingdom for a refit. During the 1934 refit two quadruple Vickers .50-calibre (12.7 mm) Mark III machine guns were added.

In 1937, Kent returned to Chatham and underwent a major refit, which included a  Krupp cemented armour belt abreast the engine and boiler rooms as well as the dynamo room and the fire control transmitting station. This belt extended  down from the lower deck. Four inches of armour were also added to protect the sides of the boiler room fan compartments. The ship's aft director was moved to a pedestal abaft the searchlight tower that replaced the original aft control station. Two octuple-barrel 2-pounder mounts were added abreast the searchlight tower. Unlike her sister ships, no aircraft hangar was added because that would have pushed her over the Washington Naval Treaty limits, but her catapult was replaced with a more powerful one capable of handling the heavier Supermarine Walrus flying boat.

Following the declaration of war by Italy, she was transferred to the Mediterranean Fleet, arriving at Alexandria in August 1940 with the 3rd Cruiser Squadron. Two weeks later the ship participated in Operation Hats, escorting a convoy from Alexandria to Malta.

During the night of 16/17 September 1940, aircraft from the Illustrious mined the harbour of Benghazi. They also attacked shipping in the harbour with torpedoes and bombs, sinking two destroyers and two merchant ships. Kent and two destroyers were detached to bombard Bardia while returning to Alexandria. During the night of 17/18 September 1940 the ship was hit in the stern by a torpedo from Italian Savoia-Marchetti SM.79 bombers from the 279th Independent Torpedo Squadron led by Carlo Emanuele Buscaglia. She was towed back to base by the destroyers with great difficulty.

Kent was given temporary repairs at Alexandria from 19 September to 18 October to allow her to return to the United Kingdom. Extensive repairs at Devonport Dockyard followed from 1 January to 20 September 1941. During this time six Oerlikon 20 mm light AA guns were added and the ship received a variety of radars. These included Type 284 radar for surface gunnery control, Type 285 anti-aircraft gunnery radar, and a Type 281 air warning radar. When her repairs were completed in September 1941, she spent
several months working up. On 8 December Kent sailed from Scapa Flow carrying the British Foreign Secretary, Anthony Eden, and the Soviet Ambassador to Great Britain, Ivan Maisky. She reached Murmansk on 12 December where the diplomats disembarked to meet with Joseph Stalin. Kent sortied on 17 December, with two Soviet destroyers, in a failed attempt to intercept the German 8th Destroyer Flotilla that was engaging two British minesweepers attempting to rendezvous with Convoy PQ 6. The ship brought Eden back home by 29 December.

The cruiser was assigned to the Home Fleet and escorted convoys to and from North Russia. She briefly escorted Convoy QP 8 on the return leg from Russia in March 1942 and provided distant cover for Convoy QP 10 the following month. On 21 May the ship joined Convoy PQ 16 as part of the close escort.

After her return from the Soviet Union, the ship was refitted in Liverpool from 18 July to 7 November. Her catapult and quadruple .50-calibre machine guns were removed and six more single 20 mm Oerlikon guns were added. In early January 1943 the cruiser provided cover for Convoy RA 51 and, several weeks later, Convoy JW 52. During a brief refit between 22 September and 4 October at Chatham Dockyard, the ship exchanged six single 20 mm guns for three twin 20 mm gun mounts. In November she provided cover to Convoys RA 54A, JW 54A and JW 54B. The ship covered the outbound Convoys JW 56A, JW 56B and the returning Convoy RA 56 in January–February 1944. The following month Kent was part of the covering force for Convoy JW 57.

On 17 July 1944, the ship was formed part of the covering force protecting three British aircraft carriers flying off aircraft to attack the  during Operation Mascot. Kent escorted three aircraft carriers that attacked the German airfield at Kristiansand on 10 August. She escorted two carriers on 12 September while their aircraft attacked German shipping near Stadlandet. On the night of 13/14 November 1944, as flagship of Rear-Admiral Rhoderick McGrigor during Operation Counterblast, the ship, with the light cruiser  and four destroyers, attacked Convoy KS.357 off Listerfjord, south-east of Egersund, Norway. The convoy consisted of four freighters escorted by the minesweepers M.416, M.427 and four submarine chasers. Opening fire at 2300 hrs, the cruisers and destroyers sank two of the freighters and all the escorts above except one unidentified vessel.

With the Naval War in the Atlantic winding down, the ship's age and material condition, and a shortage of crews to man her; Kent was paid off in January 1945 and remained in reserve for several years until she was used as a target.  The ship was struck off the Naval List (the first of the Countys to go) and allocated to BISCO on 22 January 1948 and arrived at Troon on 31 January to be broken up by West of Scotland Shipbreakers.

Footage shot by a crew member in the period 1941-45 was discovered in the archives of the Cinema Museum in London.

Footnotes

References

External links

HMS Kent at U-boat.net
HMS Kent at battleships-cruisers.co.uk

 

Kent-class cruisers
County-class cruisers of the Royal Navy
Ships built in Chatham
1926 ships
World War II cruisers of the United Kingdom